Huang Shilin (born 1967)  is a Chinese businessman, who has served as the vice chairman of Contemporary Amperex Technology (CATL), which is one of the world's largest battery suppliers for the electric vehicle industry. As of 2018, Huang owned a 12% stake within the company. Shilin also holds a B.Tech degree from the Hefei University of Technology.

Huang earned a spot on the 2022 Forbes Billionaires List with an estimated wealth of $20.3 billion and occupied the 79th position.

References 

1967 births
Living people
20th-century Chinese businesspeople
21st-century Chinese businesspeople
Businesspeople in manufacturing
Chinese billionaires
Chinese chief executives